Cosmic Vortex – Justice Divine is a 1974 album by jazz keyboardist, Weldon Irvine. His first for RCA Records

Reception 
The Allmusic review by Jason Ankeny awarded the album 4 stars stating:
After two visionary LPs for his own tiny Nodlew label, Weldon Irvine signed to RCA for Cosmic Vortex (Justice Divine), exploring the deeply spiritual and political terrain of his previous efforts on the kind of grand musical scale that major-label funding accommodates. This is a big, bold record by any measure, with a startlingly pronounced focus on lyrics and vocals. At the same time, however, the melodies spread out like tentacles, informed by the improvisational sensibilities of jazz and the deep-groove spirit of funk.

Track listings
All songs written by Weldon Irvine.

"Love Your Brother"     5:15   
"Walk That Walk; Talk That Talk"     7:50   
"Love Jones"     4:11   
"I'll Name It Tomorrow"     2:50   
"Cosmic Vortex (Justice Divine)"     8:45   
"Quiet (In Memory of Duke Ellington)"     5:06   
"Let Yourself Be Free"     4:30   
"Love Your Brother (Sanctified Version)"     1:30

Personnel
Weldon Irvine - keyboards, soprano saxophone, vocals
Henry Grate, Jr., Cornell Dupree, Joe Caro - guitar
Bob Cranshaw, Gordon Edwards, George Murray - bass
Wesley "Gator" Watson, Jimmy Young, Lenny White, Chipper Lyles - drums
Napoleon Revels - percussion
Bud Johnson, Jr. - congas, bongos
Gene Jefferson - tenor saxophone
Jimmy Owens, Roy Roman, Everett "Blood" Hollins - trumpet
Bill Barnwell - flute
Nalo, Ojuleba - vocals

"With a special thanks to Tom Draper for his aid and support throughout."

References

External links
 Weldon Irvine-Cosmic Vortex - Justice Divine at Discogs

1974 albums
RCA Records albums
Weldon Irvine albums
Albums conducted by Weldon Irvine
Albums arranged by Weldon Irvine